Coop Himmelb(l)au (A pun meaning Coop Sky Building and Coop Sky Blue) is an architecture, urban planning, design, and art firm founded by Wolf D. Prix, Helmut Swiczinsky, and Michael Holzer in Vienna, Austria in 1968.

History 
Coop Himmelb(l)au was founded in 1968 by Wolf D. Prix, Helmut Swiczinsky and Michael Holzer in Vienna and has been active in the fields of architecture, urban planning, design and art ever since. In 1988 a second studio was opened in Los Angeles. Further project offices are located in Frankfurt, Germany and Paris, France. 

The architecture studio Coop Himmelb(l)au is now run by Wolf D. Prix, Harald Krieger, Karolin Schmidbaur and project partners. The project partners include Michael Beckert, Luzie Giencke, Andrea Graser, Helmut Holleis, Markus Pillhofer, Markus Prossnigg, Wolfgang Reicht, Frank Stepper and Michael Volk. Michael Holzer early left the office in 1971. Helmut Swiczinsky retiredt from operational business in 2001, and his final retirement was in 2006. Wolf D. Prix heads the studio as Design Principal / CEO. From 2000 to 2011 Wolfdieter Dreibholz was managing director and partner of Coop Himmelb(l)au. Harald Krieger became partner and managing director of COOP HIMMELB(L)AU Europe GmbH in Frankfurt am Main in 2003. In 2011 he also took over the financial management of the studio as CFO. Karolin Schmidbaur became a partner in the office in 1996 and she is currently the design and managing partner of the office in Vienna (since 2009) and head of the studio in Los Angeles (since 2003).

The group's works were featured in the Museum of Modern Art's Deconstructivist Architecture exhibition in 1988, curated by Philip Johnson and Mark Wigley. As a result, Coop Himmelb(l)au was henceforth included in the group of deconstructivist architects. The bureau never officially included itself in this group. However, certain working practices, such as collage, and the architectural language show similarities with other architects in this direction.

World-renowned institutions such as the Getty Center in Los Angeles, the Museum of Applied Arts, Vienna (MAK) and the Centre Pompidou show works by Coop Himmelb(l)au in their permanent exhibitions. In 1996, Coop Himmelb(l)au was invited to represent Austria at the 6th International Venice Biennale. Since then, the office has been represented there regularly and has presented projects such as the Musée des Confluences in Lyon and the Guangzhou Opera House. The Musée des Confluences in Lyon was also presented from 2002 to 2003 at the Latent Utopias exhibition in Graz. Coop Himmelb(l)au was also represented several times in the Aedes East Gallery in Berlin, for example in the exhibitions Skyline 1985, The Vienna Trilogy + One Cinema 1998 and in an exhibition for the competition for the BMW Experience and Delivery Center in 2002. In In the same year Coop Himmelb(l)au was present at the 8th Architecture Biennale in Venice with the BMW Welt projects and a design for the new World Trade Center. In 2007/2008 the office was the subject of the exhibition COOP HIMMELB(L)AU. Beyond the Blue of the MAK in Vienna. At the 11th Architecture Biennale in Venice, Coop Himmelb(l)au was represented with two contributions: Astroballon 1969 Revisited – Feedback Space in the Arsenale and Brain City Lab in the Italian Pavilion. In 2009 the exhibition COOP HIMMELB(L)AU. Beyond the Blue could be seen at the Wexner Center for the Arts, Columbus (Ohio).

Coop Himmelb(l)au was responsible for the design of several exhibitions, for example Paradise Cage: Kiki Smith and Coop Himmelb(l)au, which was shown in 1996 at the Museum of Contemporary Art, Los Angeles. One of the best-known is the exhibition Rudi Gernreich: Fashion will go out of Fashion from 2000 for the Styrian Autumn in Graz, which was later shown in Philadelphia.

In January 2022, the firm’s partners were sanctioned by the president of Ukraine for illegally doing business in the Russian-occupied Crimean peninsula.

Selected projects

 Villa Rosa, Wien (1966–70) 
 Rooftop Remodeling Falkestrasse, Vienna, Austria (1983–88)
 Academy of Fine Arts Munich (1992/2002–05)
 Groninger Museum, Groningen, Netherlands (1993–94)
 Gasometer, Vienna, Austria (1999–2001)
 BMW Welt ("BMW World"), Munich, Germany (2001–07)
 Akron Art Museum addition (2007)
 High School for the Visual and Performing Arts with HMC Architects (Los Angeles Area High School #9, California, USA) (2002–08)
 Busan Cinema Center, Busan, South Korea (2008–2011)
 Musikkens Hus in Aalborg, Denmark (2010–2014)
 The New European Central Bank in Frankfurt (2010–2014)
 Musée des Confluences, Lyon, France (completed 2014)
 Museum „Paneum“ in Asten, Austria (2010–2017)
 Alban Berg Monument, Vienna, Austria (2015–2016)

Awards 
 2008 RIBA European Award for BMW World
 2005 American Architecture Awards
 The Chicago Athenaeum, Illinois
 Akron Art Museum, Ohio, USA (2001–2006)
 2004 Annie Spink Award for excellence in architectural education, RIBA, London, UK
 2002 Gold Medal for merits to the federal state of Vienna, Austria 
 1992 Schelling Architecture Prize

See also 
 Deconstructivism

References

External links 
 Official site
Coop Himmelblau architectural models and drawings for five projects, 1983–1995, Getty Research Institute, Los Angeles. Accession No. 2002.M.2. The five projects are: Open House, Malibu, California, 1983-circa 1990; Rooftop Office Remodeling, Vienna, 1983–1989; City Plan for Melun Sénart, France, 1987; Rehak House, Malibu, California, 1990-circa 1995; and Anselm Kiefer Studios, Buchen, Germany, 1990 and Barjac, France, 1992.

Deconstructivism
Architecture firms of Austria
!
Honorary Fellows of the American Institute of Architects